Treasure Valley is a Native American casino located in the Arbuckle Mountains of Davis, Oklahoma in the south-central part of the state. Owned and operated by the Chickasaw Nation, the gaming center was opened in July 2003. The Inn at Treasure Valley is a 59-room hotel has an indoor swimming pool and jacuzzi, continental breakfast, exercise room and dry sauna, as well as four conference rooms.
Overlooking the Washita River Valley and located along Interstate-35 and Highway 7 at Exit 55, the  Treasure Valley Casino is near several other key attractions in the area. It is 5.5 miles from Turner Falls and the Arbuckle Wilderness Exotic Animal Theme Park, and 13 miles from the Chickasaw Cultural Center. Treasure Valley is approximately 55 miles south of Norman, Oklahoma which is home to the Nation's sister gaming facility, Riverwind Casino, and 50 miles north of WinStar World Casino in Thackerville, Oklahoma.

Games
The gaming center draws more than 130,000 customers annually and has 400 gaming machines as well as tables for Blackjack, Ultimate Texas Hold ‘Em and 3-card Poker.

References

External links
Treasure Valley's website

Casinos completed in 2003
Hotel buildings completed in 2003
Casinos in Oklahoma
Chickasaw Nation casinos
Buildings and structures in Murray County, Oklahoma
Tourist attractions in Murray County, Oklahoma